An architectural illustrator is an artist who creates imagery for the design professional that accurately portray the details of an architectural project.  These images are used to communicate design ideas to clients, owners, committees, customers, and the general public.

About
Architectural illustrators are hired to put complex concepts or objects into graphical form. The artist uses artwork to turn small details into visual renderings. This field is based on the plan, design, and construction of numerous structures. Illustrations created are typically two-dimensional and may include images or animations. Technical draftsmanship and precise use of visual perspective are often prominent features in architectural illustration, although within these restrictions some artists such as William Walcot were known for a more fluid impressionistic style.

Architectural illustrations and models are often used during client presentations, fundraising events, sales pitches, and meetings regarding permits.

Software
Computer based software such as SketchUp and other products produced by a variety of publishers can be used by architectural illustrators in creating architectural renderings.

See also
3d computer graphics
Architects
Architectural model
Architectural rendering
Illustrator
Watercolor

Architectural Illustrator Associations
The American Society of Architectural Illustrators (ASAI)
New York Society of Renderers
The Society of Architectural Illustration (SAI)

References

Illustrator